Luigi Giuseppe Faravelli (29 October 1852 - 22 March 1914) was an Italian admiral who fought in the Italo-Turkish War.

Military service

Not much is known about his history prior to his naval career but he first entered service as Rear Admiral in 1905, then promoted to Vice Admiral in 1911. His most notable accomplishment was participating in the Italo-Turkish War where he commanded the 2nd Naval Squadron, which on 2 October 1911 deployed in front of the port of Tripoli, where he had the task of keeping the waters safe in view of the planned landing of the Italian expeditionary force and prevent the influx of reinforcements and supplies from the Ottoman Empire. On 5 October 1911 Faravelli accepted the surrender of the city of Tripoli from the local notables and the German consul Adrian Tilger and to issue on the 6th the famous proclamation to the Libyans with which among other things he declared:

After the war, he was President of the Superior Council of the Navy in 1912, as well as Senator of the Kingdom from 17 March 1912.

He died in Rome in 1914 and to this day he is buried in the family tomb in the cemetery of Stradella.

The institute for surveyors and accountants of Stradella (Pv) and the Liceo Scientifico of Broni (Pv) are named in his honor.

References

External links
 
 
 
 

Italian admirals
1852 births
1914 deaths
Italian military personnel of the Italo-Turkish War
People from Stradella